The Wii Fit Trainer is a fictional character who first appeared in the 2007 video game Wii Fit as the player's personal trainer. Players may choose from either a male or female trainer, though the female trainer has gained much more popularity courtesy of her being the default trainer in the Super Smash Bros. series, starting with 2014's Super Smash Bros. for Nintendo 3DS and Wii U and returning in 2018's Super Smash Bros. Ultimate.

Concept 
The Wii Fit Trainer is a mannequin-like personal trainer. Male and female versions appear in the Wii Fit series, where they assist the player with performing various workouts and yoga poses, as well as often giving encouragement and advice during the sessions. Players can also compete with them in small challenges, such as doing the most push-ups. In the Super Smash Bros. series, this is translated into their moveset, which involves attacks derived from multiple yoga poses and some of the minigames, such as twirling Hula Hoops and heading soccer balls.

Appearances 
The Wii Fit Trainer debuted as a personal trainer for players in the 2008 Wii video game Wii Fit. Players could either choose a male or female option. The success of the first game led to the trainers returning for the expanded Wii Fit Plus and the sequel Wii Fit U, now sporting redesigns. The female trainer was revealed at the 2013 E3 convention to be a playable character in the 2014 video game Super Smash Bros. for Nintendo 3DS and Wii U alongside a human villager from the Animal Crossing series and Capcom's Mega Man. Series director Masahiro Sakurai noted that while he expected that people would see no meaning behind the trainer's inclusion, he included her because of his perception of her uniqueness and to surprise people, instead of doing so for "cheap novelty."

It was later revealed by Sakurai, in commemoration of the release of the trial version of Wii Fit U, that the male trainer would also appear, albeit as an alternate character that shares the female's slot and characteristics. The Wii Fit Trainers were announced to return in the series' next installment Super Smash Bros. Ultimate alongside every fighter that has appeared in the series' history at the 2018 E3 convention. Due to the female trainer's growing popularity, she has made appearances outside of Super Smash Bros., including a cameo in Super Mario Maker as a costume that Mario can don in the Super Mario Bros. theme, a design based on her color scheme that Yarn Yoshi can wear in Yoshi's Woolly World, and a costume based on her attire in One Piece: Super Grand Battle! X.

Reception 
According to US Gamer, the female Wii Fit Trainer has gained a cult following their announcement in Super Smash Bros. for Nintendo 3DS and Wii U initially receiving positive attention from people on the Internet as well as skepticism from critics such as PC Magazines Will Greenwald. Mike Fahey from Kotaku expressed disappointment in the announcement of her inclusion, noting that "at least the video is hilarious." Marc Zablotny from Official Nintendo Magazine called her "Smash Bros new leading lady. Destructoids Jordan Devore noted that he had "crack[ed] up" over their E3 reveal. According to John Adams of his "Female Fighters: Perceptions of Femininity in the Super Smash Bros. Community", that Wii Fit Trainer's female costumes is different from the male, noting that female costumes wear a tank top that expose some of their midriff.

Several of Kotaku's staff praised her inclusion; Patricia Hernandez wrote that Wii Fit Trainer was one of her favorite characters in Nintendo 3DS and Wii U, citing their uniqueness and charm as factors; Cecilia D'Anastasio said that characters like Wii Fit Trainer were what made the game worth playing; Susana Polo stated that nothing had excited them to buy a Wii U more than Wii Fit Trainer's reveal, due to both the relatively low number of female characters in the series and her experience with the Wii Fit series; and Owen S. Good calling them an inspired choice, later calling their inclusion one of the best character choices for any fighting game. However some on the site expressed their disappointment, such as writer Mike Fahey mocking Nintendo as being out of touch and expressing bemusement at her being in Super Smash Bros.

IGN listed Super Smash Bros. for Nintendo 3DS and Wii U along with Wii Fit Trainer's reveal as one of the "biggest surprises of 2013", with editor Brendan Graeber stating that the audience had "a few audible groans" and that "disappointment gave way to confusion, and ultimately wild cheers as the next character in the Smash Brothers roster was revealed." Polygon ranked her 39th on their list of the most important Super Smash Bros. characters list. Gavin Jasper of Den of Geek ranked Wii Fit Trainer as 51st of Super Smash Bros. Ultimate characters, stating that "Wii Fit Trainer fits in with Mr. Game & Watch as one of those ridiculous Nintendo personalities that’s so stupid that it works in this setting."

Merchandise 
An amiibo of the female Wii Fit Trainer was created as part of the Super Smash Bros. series in a limited capacity, being one of 10 amiibo originally released on November 21, 2014. Hardcore Gamer's Geoff Thew criticized the design of her amiibo due to its flat design and the large chunk of plastic used to hold it up. The amiibo is compatible with multiple games, including Super Smash Bros. for Nintendo 3DS and Wii U, Super Smash Bros. Ultimate, Super Mario Maker, One Piece: Super Grand Battle X, and others. It was discontinued alongside Marth and Villager amiibo, with the three had the highest sell-through rate in the United States during their initial release, leading to it becoming a rare collectible following their discontinuation. It was later re-released alongside others to accompany the release of Super Smash Bros. Ultimate.

References 

Video game characters introduced in 2007
Nintendo protagonists
Nintendo characters
Super Smash Bros. fighters
Fictional personal trainers
Video game characters of selectable gender
Fictional gymnasts
Fictional characters who can manipulate light
Fictional characters with energy-manipulation abilities
Fictional martial artists